Anisus natalensis is a species of a freshwater snail, an aquatic pulmonate gastropod mollusk in the family Planorbidae, the ram's horn snails.

Distribution 
This species occurs in countries that include:
 South Africa
 Mozambique

References

Planorbidae